The  is a subsidiary company of Tōbu Bus.

Outline
In 2002, Tōbu Railway was split into a railway company and a bus company. The bus company was further divided into Tōbu Bus Nikkō, Tōbu Bus West, Tōbu Bus East (discontinued in 2022), and Tōbu Bus Central. Tōbu Bus Nikkō operates all routes in the area around Nikkō Station and Tōbu-Nikkō Station in Nikko, Tochigi. The area served by these bus routes includes many tourist destinations, such as Tōshō-gū, Chūzenji, and Rinnō-ji.

Vehicles

The company primarily uses Hino Rainbow and Isuzu Erga models which are types of stage carriage buses, but due to demand for sightseeing buses which require keeping the interior warm in winter, the company also uses the Hino Selega, a type of sightseeing bus. Isuzu Erga was introduced as a "two-seater" in 2012 as part of the company's efforts to improve accessibility for disabled passengers.

The buses can be accessed via doors in the front and/or middle of the bus, with the exception of the "sightseeing buses" which only feature a door in the front.

Offices
Nikkō office
Chūzenji information desk

Highway buses

Tickets
Tickets for riding the bus are sold at information desks at Tōbu Nikkō Station, Chūzenji Onsen, and Yumoto Onsen.

Normal tickets
Normal tickets are single-use tickets with a designated destination.
Tickets for destinations between Tōbu-Nikkō Station and Yumoto Onsen allow passengers to get on and off freely between the Shinkyo bus stop near the tōshō-gū and the Chūzenji Onsen bus stop near Lake Chūzenji.

Free Pass Tickets
Free pass tickets allow the purchaser to get on and off at any bus stops within the designated area of the ticket, and are almost all available for two days, though there are exceptions.

Yumoto Onsen Free Pass

Chūzenji Onsen Free Pass
Can be used at Nikkō Station, Tōbu-Nikkō Station, the Shinkyo bus stop (tōshō-gū), Umakaeshi, the Chūzenji Onsen bus stop (Lake Chūzenji), the Osaki bus stop, and for the World Heritage Sightseeing Bus.

Senjōgahara Free Pass
Can be used at Nikkō Station, Tōbu-Nikkō Station, the Shinkyo bus stop (tōshō-gū), Umakaeshi, the Chūzenji Onsen bus stop (Lake Chūzenji), the Sanbonmatsu bus stop, and for the World Heritage Sightseeing Bus.

Ozasa Bokujō Free Pass
Can be used at Nikkō Station, Tōbu-Nikkō Station, Falls, Kirifuri Kōgen, Ozasa Bokujō, and for the World Heritage Sightseeing Bus.

Kirifuri Kōgen Free Pass
Can be used at Nikkō Station, Tōbu-Nikkō Station, Kirifuri Falls, Kirifuri Kōgen, and for the World Heritage Sightseeing Bus.

Kirifuri Falls Free Pass (valid for only 1 day)
Can be used at Nikkō Station, Tōbu-Nikkō Station, Kirifuri Falls, and for the World Heritage Sightseeing Bus.

World Heritage Tour Free Pass (valid for only 1 day)
Can be used at Nikkō Station, Tōbu-Nikkō Station, Nishi Sandō (tōshō-gū), and for the World Heritage Sightseeing Bus.

 (valid for 4 days)
A round-trip ticket which allows the purchaser to travel from any station of the Tōbu Railway Tōbu Skytree Line to the designated Free Ride Area. The Free Ride Area consists of train lines in the area between Shimo-Imaichi Station and Tōbu-Nikkō Station on the Tōbu Nikkō line, as well as Tōbu Bus Nikkō bus lines.

IC cards
Passengers have been able to use IC cards (PASMO/Suica) to ride Tōbu Bus Nikkō since 23 February 2010.

Parent Company

Tōbu Bus

The  is a bus company within the Tobu Group which was established on 30 January 2002 to inherit all shares of the Tōbu Railway bus division.

Outline
The company was established on 30 January 2002 by spinning off from Tōbu Railway. The company began formal operations in its current form on 30 September 2002. In addition, Tōbu Railway was split into Tōbu Bus East, Tōbu Bus Central, Tōbu Bus West, Tōbu Bus Nikko. Tōbu Bus is a holding company owning assets of these different subsidiaries, and as such does not operate any bus routes directly. However, the company does sell tickets for bus routes which these subsidiaries operate, as well as managing lease of their properties.

History
The history of Tobu Bus begins with the establishment of Mōbu Motor, which was an affiliated company of Tōbu Railway in Gunma and Saitama in 1933. The bus department of Tōbu Railway was established in Kawagoe, Saitama on 1 April 1934.
In September 1936, these two companies were combined into Tōbu Motor and the new company inherited the service areas of Saitama, Gunma, Ibaraki, and Tochigi from Tōbu-affiliated companies.

After World War II, Tōbu Motor and Tōbu Nikkō Tramway were taken over by Tōbu Railway. The bus business ran a deficit in 1980 because passengers decreased by 80%, and Tōbu Railway decided to split up as described above in September 2001 due to the difficulty of continuing to operate. The offices and bus routes not transferred to Tōbu Bus at the time of this split were transferred to Asahi Motor Group around 1990.

20 January 2002: Tōbu Bus was transferred the assets and share of stock of the bus department of Tōbu Railway.
1 October 2002: Tōbu Bus and the three affiliated companies listed above started operations.
1 October 2021: Tōbu Bus East was merged into Tōbu Bus Central.

Bus routes
Tōbu Bus Nikkō
Tōbu Bus West
Tōbu Bus Central

Other group companies

Tōbu Bus West

The  is a subsidiary company of Tobu Bus. The head office is located in Ōmiya-ku, Saitama.

Outline

In 2002, the company was spun off from Tōbu Railway. The bus company runs in the area around the train stations serviced by the Tōbu Urban Park Line, the Takasaki Line, and the Tōbu Tōjō Line in Saitama. The company primarily serves tourists to (Kawagoe) as well as commuters.

Offices
Ōmiya Business Office (OM)
Iwatsuki Office
Amanuma Office
Ageo Office (AO)
Kawagoe Business Office (KG)
Sakado Office
Niiza Business Office (NZ)

Highway buses

Ticket
About tickets for Koedo Kawagoe

TOBU BUS CENTRAL

 is a subsidiary company of Tōbu Bus. The head office is located in Adachi.

Outline

In 2002, the company was spun off from the Tōbu  Railway bus department. The bus company operates in the area around the train stations serving the Tōbu Skytree Line. On 1 October 2021, Tōbu Bus East was merged into Tōbu Bus Central. Following this, the company began operating in the area servicing the stations of the Tōbu Urban Park Line, the Tsukuba Express, and the Jōban Line in Chiba.

Office
Adachi Business Office (AD)
Nishi-Arai Office
Katsushika Office
Hanahata Office
Soka Business Office (SK)
Yashio Office
Misato Office
Yoshikawa Office
Nishi-Kashiwa Business Office (KW)
Shōnan Office

Highway buses

Ticket
About tickets for Ueno/Adachi

Bibliography

Reference
Other bus companies in the Tōbu Group:
Asahi Motor Corporation
Companies previously belonging to the Tōbu Group:
Aizu Bus
Toya Kōtsū

See also
Tobu Railway
Tobu Bus
Asahi Motor
Akechidaira Ropeway

External links

Official Website
Official Website(ja)

Bus companies of Japan
Transport in Saitama Prefecture
Transport in Chiba Prefecture
Transport in Tokyo
Tobu Railway
Nikkō, Tochigi
Japanese companies established in 2002
Transport in Tochigi Prefecture